The 'Brahm Kai Meu' mango (known locally as 'Pram Kai Mea', or 'Phram Khai Mia') is a named mango cultivar of Thai origin. Although it is relatively new in Florida, it appears to be doing very well so far, in terms of growth and yield.

Loosely translated, the name (from) means that this mango is so good that even a Brahmin would trade his own wife for a Brahm Kai Meu mango.

Description 
In Thailand, Brahm Kai Meu mango is eaten also in its green state. When ripe, Brahm Kai Meu stays relatively green with hardly any change in color.

This mango is sweet and fibreless.

See also 
 List of mango cultivars

References 

Mango cultivars
Flora of Florida
Cultivars originating in Thailand